Rose of the Wilderness (German:Die Rose der Wildnis) is a 1918 German silent film directed by Walter Schmidthässler and starring Asta Nielsen.

Cast
 Curt Goetz 
 Asta Nielsen as Wanda  
 Joseph Schröder 
 Magnus Stifter

References

Bibliography
 Lloyd, Ann. Movies of the Silent Years. Orbis, 1984.

External links

1918 films
Films of the German Empire
German silent feature films
Fictional representations of Romani people
German black-and-white films
1910s German films